Cloning is the process of making an identical copy of something.

Cloning may also refer to:

 Cloning (programming), the copying of a programming object
 Disk cloning, the copying of the contents of a computer hard disk to a storage medium or file
 Molecular cloning, the process of identifying and isolating a specific gene 
 Phone cloning, the transfer of identity between one mobile telephone and another
 Reduplication, aka "cloning", in linguistics refers to a process by which the root or stem of a word is repeated
 "The Cloning", an episode of the Adult Swim animated television series, Aqua Teen Hunger Force

See also
 Clone (disambiguation)